Multitude is a term for a group of people who cannot be classed under any other distinct category, except for their shared fact of existence. Though its use dates back to antiquity, the term first entered into the lexicon of political philosophy when it was used by figures like Machiavelli, Hobbes, and most notably, Spinoza. The multitude is a concept of a population that has not entered into a social contract with a sovereign political body, such that individuals retain the capacity for political self-determination. A multitude typically is classified as a quantity exceeding 100. For Hobbes the multitude was a rabble that needed to enact a social contract with a monarch, thus turning them from a multitude into a people. For Machiavelli and Spinoza both, the role of the multitude vacillates between admiration and contempt. Recently the term has returned to prominence as a new model of resistance against global systems of power as described by political theorists Michael Hardt and Antonio Negri in their international best-seller Empire (2000) and expanded upon in their Multitude: War and Democracy in the Age of Empire (2004). Other theorists recently began to use the term include political thinkers associated with autonomist Marxism and its sequelae, including Sylvère Lotringer, Paolo Virno, and thinkers connected with the eponymous review Multitudes.

History
The concept originates in Machiavelli’s Discorsi. It is, however, with Hobbes's recasting of the concept as the war-disposed, dissolute pole of the opposition between a Multitude and a People in De Cive, that Spinoza’s conceptualization seems, according to Negri, contrasted.

The multitude is used as a term and implied as a concept throughout Spinoza's work. In the Tractatus Theologico-Politicus, for instance, he acknowledges that the (fear of the) power (potentia) of the multitude is the limit of sovereign power (potestas): "Every ruler has more to fear from his own citizens […] than from any foreign enemy, and it is this 'fear of the masses' [... that is] the principal brake on the power of the sovereign or state." The explication of this tacit concept, however, only comes in Spinoza's last and unfinished work known as the Political Treatise:
It must next be observed, that in laying foundations it is very necessary to study the human passions: and it is not enough to have shown, what ought to be done, but it ought, above all, to be shown how it can be effected, that men, whether led by passion or reason, should yet keep the laws firm and unbroken. For if the constitution of the dominion, or the public liberty depends only on the weak assistance of the laws, not only will the citizens have no security for its maintenance [...], but it will even turn to their ruin. [...] And, therefore, it would be far better for the subjects to transfer their rights absolutely to one man, than to bargain for unascertained and empty, that is unmeaning, terms of liberty, and so prepare for their posterity a way to the most cruel servitude. But if I succeed in showing that the foundation of monarchical dominion [...], are firm and cannot be plucked up, without the indignation of the larger part of an armed multitude, and that from them follow peace and security for king and multitude, and if I deduce this from general human nature, no one will be able to doubt, that these foundations are the best and the true ones.

The concept of the multitude resolves the tension that scholars have observed in Spinoza’s political project between the insistence on the benign function of sovereignty (as witnessed in the quotation above) and the insistence on individual freedom. It is, we see here, a truly revolutionary concept, and it is not difficult to see why Spinoza’s contemporaries (and, as for instance Étienne Balibar has implied, even Spinoza himself) saw it as a dangerous political idea.

Reiteration by Negri and Hardt
Negri describes the multitude in his The Savage Anomaly as an unmediated, revolutionary, immanent, and positive collective social subject which can found a "nonmystified" form of democracy (p. 194). In his more recent writings with Michael Hardt, however, he does not so much offer a direct definition, but presents the concept through a series of mediations. In Empire it is mediated by the concept of Empire (the new global constitution that Negri and Hardt describe as a copy of Polybius's description of Roman government):

New figures of struggle and new subjectivities are produced in the conjecture of events, in the universal nomadism [...] They are not posed merely against the imperial system—they are not simply negative forces. They also express, nourish, and develop positively their own constituent projects. [...] This constituent aspect of the movement of the multitude, in its myriad faces, is really the positive terrain of the historical construction of Empire, [...] an antagonistic and creative positivity. The deterritorializing power of the multitude is the productive force that sustains Empire and at the same time the force that calls for and makes necessary its destruction.

They remain however vague  as to this "positive" or "constituent" aspect of the Multitude:

Certainly, there must be a moment when reappropriation [of wealth from capital] and selforganization [of the multitude] reach a threshold and configure a real event. This is when the political is really affirmed—when the genesis is complete and self-valorization, the cooperative convergence of subjects, and the proletarian management of production become a constituent power. [...] We do not have any models to offer for this event. Only the multitude through its practical experimentation will offer the models and determine when and how the possible becomes real.

In their sequel Multitude: War and Democracy in the Age of Empire they still refrain from a clear definition of the concept but approach the concept through mediation of a host of "contemporary" phenomena, most importantly the new type of postmodern war they postulate and the history of post-WWII resistance movements. It remains a rather vague concept which is assigned a revolutionary potential without much theoretical substantiation apart from a generic potential of love.

Sylvère Lotringer has criticized Negri and Hardt's use of the concept for its ostensible return to the dialectical dualism in the introduction to Paulo Virno's A Grammar of the Multitude (see external links).

See also
Feeding the multitude
Global citizens movement

References

External links

 Hardt & Negri's 'Multitude': the worst of both worlds by Thomas N. Hale and Anne-Marie Slaughter 
 The Multitude Project
 Approximations: Towards an Ontological Definition of the Multitude by Antonio Negri
 
 Raymond van de Wiel, "Remote History Re-emerges: The Multitude and Stoicism," (February 2007) [A critical history of the Multitude]
 Warren Montag, "Who's afraid of the Multitude? Between the Individual and the State," The South Atlantic Quarterly 104:4 (Fall 2005).
 
 Joseph Choonara, "Marx or the multitude?," International Socialism: A quarterly journal of socialist theory, issue 105 (Winter 2005) [review of Hardt and Negri's book Multitude: War and Democracy in the Age of Empire].
 Paolo Virno, A Grammar of the Multitude: For an Analysis of Contemporary Forms of Life, Semiotext[e] (6 Feb 2004) 
 Nicolas Colin and Henri Verdier, "The Economics of the Multitude", ParisTech Review (7 June 2012) [interview following their book L'Age de la Multitude].
 Jacopo Galimberti, "What does a multitude look like?", in The Nomos of Images. Manifestation and Iconology of Law, 3 December 2015, https://nomoi.hypotheses.org/263

Autonomism
Niccolò Machiavelli
Political science terminology
Social concepts
Spinozism